San José del Peñasco is a town and municipality in Oaxaca in south-western Mexico. The municipality covers an area of 75.3 km². 
It is part of the Miahuatlán District in the south of the Sierra Sur Region.

As of 2005, the municipality had a total population of 1863.

References

Municipalities of Oaxaca